John Edward Kelly (17 June 1840 – 4 November 1896) was an Australian politician.

He was born at Swan Reach near Morpeth to settler James Kelly and Mary O'Keefe. He was the storekeeper on the family station, and by the age of eighteen was a head stockman. From 1862 he was a pastoralist in his own right at Bourke. In 1875, he moved to Sydney, where he operated a dairy and sawmill; he also owned a Molong copper mill. 

On 26 August 1862 he married Margaret Agnes Tierney, with whom he had seven children. In 1887 he was elected to the New South Wales Legislative Assembly as a Free Trade member for Bogan. He was defeated in 1889. Kelly died at Peak Hill in 1896.

References

 

1840 births
1896 deaths
Members of the New South Wales Legislative Assembly
Free Trade Party politicians
19th-century Australian politicians